Isabel Pisano (Montevideo, 1948) is a Uruguayan actress, writer and journalist that has lived in several countries.

Biography
She has worked with several film directors from Argentina, Spain (Bilbao by Bigas Luna) and Italy (Casanova by Federico Fellini).

War journalist for RAI (Italy) and El Mundo, she covered Palestine, Lebanon, Chad, Iraq, Bosnia and Somalia. She was the only journalist present at Mosul and Basra bombings in 1993. She was granted a medal by the Spanish Culture Ministry.

The film Whore (2004) is based upon her 2003 book Yo, puta.

She has also written Bigas Luna's biography Sombras de Bigas, luces de Luna.

Isabel Pisano was married to Argentinian composer Waldo de los Ríos, who died in 1977. Later she accompanied Yasser Arafat during 12 years.

Selected filmography
 Savage Pampas (1966)

Work
 Yasir Arafat: La pasion de un lider, Ediciones B., 2006.
 Yo Terrorista, Plaza & Janés Editories, 2004.
 La Sospecha: El Complot Que Amenaza La Sociedad Actual, Belacqva, 2003.
 El Amado Fantasma, Plaza & Janés Editories, 2002

References

External links
 Isabel Pisano, actress (IMDb) 

1948 births
Women war correspondents
People from Montevideo
Uruguayan expatriate journalists
Uruguayan film actresses
Uruguayan war correspondents
Living people